This is a list of the swimming records for Hong Kong. These are the fastest times ever swum by a swimmer representing Hong Kong, for both long course (50m) and short course (25m) pools.

These records are kept by the Hong Kong national swimming federation: Hong Kong Amateur Swimming Association (HKASA).

All records were achieved in finals unless otherwise specified.

Long course (50 m)

Men

Women

Mixed relay

Short course (25 m)

Men

Women

Mixed relay

References
General
Hong Kong Long Course records 6 March 2023 updated
Hong Kong Short Course records 6 March 2023 updated
Specific

External links
 HKASA web site

Hong Kong
Records
Swimming
Swimming